Francisco Javier Aramendia Llorente (born 5 December 1986) is a Spanish former professional road bicycle racer, who rode professionally between 2008 and 2016 for the  and  teams.

Career
Aramendia was born in Pamplona. At the 2012 Vuelta a España, Aramendia distinguished himself by being part of numerous long breakaways, earning the Combativity award four times in the process, the most at the Vuelta. It looked like he had a great chance to win the "Most Combative" title for the whole race, but Alberto Contador prevailed. Aramendia was named the most combative rider overall in the 2013 Vuelta a España, after taking the award three times in the individual stages.

Major results

2006
 1st Stage 2 Bizkaiko Bira
2007
 7th Overall Vuelta a Extremadura
2012
 Vuelta a España
 Combativity award Stages 2, 7, 8 & 10
2013
 Vuelta a España
 Combativity award Stages 7, 9, 17 & Overall
2014
 Vuelta a España
 Combativity award Stages 2, 8 & 15

References

External links

Javier Aramendia's profile on Cycling Base 

Spanish male cyclists
1986 births
Living people
Sportspeople from Pamplona
Cyclists from Navarre